Aziz M. Osman (born Abdul Aziz Othman @ Yusof; 2 October 1962) is a Singaporean-born Malaysian actor, director, screenwriter and producer. He is currently the director general of his own production company, Ace Motion Pictures Sdn Bhd.

Career 
Aziz started his acting career as an infant in 1963 film, Ibu Ayam directed by Salleh Ghani. In 1976, at the age of 13, he alongside his three siblings took a role in 1976 film, Sayang Anakku Sayang directed by Jamil Sulong and is a remake of a 1970 Shaw Brothers film, The Younger Generation. The film earned Aziz won the Best Child Star at the 22nd Asia Pacific Film Festival.

His directing career begin in 1990 when he directed his debut film, Fenomena which starring Ramona Rahman and M. Nasir. Aziz also an avid fan of science fiction films made by Steven Spielberg and George Lucas, which inspired him to write and direct Malaysia's first science fiction film, XX Ray. He also took the main role as a university student named Amir. The success of XX Ray led him to directed its two sequels, which released in 1995 and 2019 respectively. The third sequel received negative reviews upon its release. Since then, he directed more films which commercially success, including Puteri Impian (1997) and Leftenan Adnan (2000).

Personal life 
He was born in Hougang, Singapore and raised in Kuala Lumpur, Malaysia.

His father is M. Osman (born Othman @ Yusof Mohamed), a well-known Malaysian singer in 1960s, while his mother Afida Es is a veteran actress. His brother Zulkifli is also a film director. Aziz is married three times, to which he has 7 children from these marriages.

Filmography

Film

Television series

Telemovie

Awards and nominations 
 Best Director (Baginda) ... TV3's Anugerah Skrin 97/98, 1998
 Best Editor (Femina) ... 11th Malaysia Film Festival, 1994
 Best Art Director (Femina) ... 11th Malaysia Film Festival, 1994
 Promising New Director (Fenomena) ... 9th Malaysia Film Festival, 1990
 Best Child Actor (Sayang Anakku Sayang) ... 22nd Asia Film Festival, South Korea, 1976

References

External links
 

1962 births
Living people
Malaysian male actors
Malaysian people of Malay descent
Malaysian film directors
People from Kuala Lumpur
Malay-language film directors